Cyclic pyranopterin monophosphate synthase (MOCS1A, MoaA, MoaC, molybdenum cofactor biosynthesis protein 1) is an enzyme with systematic name GTP 8,9-lyase (cyclic pyranopterin monophosphate-forming). This enzyme catalyses the following chemical reaction

 GTP  cyclic pyranopterin monophosphate + diphosphate

This enzyme catalyses an early step in the biosynthesis of molybdopterin.

References

External links 
 

EC 4.1.99